An atheist is a person who does not believe in deities.

Atheist or The Atheist may also refer to:

 Atheist (band), a U.S. technical death metal band
 The Atheist (comics), a 2005 horror comic book published by Image Comics
 The Atheist (play), a 2005 play by Ronan Noone 
 Atheis (Atheist in English), a 1949 Indonesian novel by Achdiat Karta Mihardja

See also
 Negative and positive atheism
 Implicit and explicit atheism
 Lists of atheists
 Atheist manifesto (disambiguation)